The Château de Coudray-Salbart is a ruined 13th-century castle in the commune of Échiré, 10 km north of Niort in the Deux-Sèvres département of France.

The castle was the object of a preservation programme by volunteers of the charitable group REMPART between 1978 and 2003. Since 2000, it has been owned by the Communauté d'Agglomération de Niort. Since 2005, volunteers have been replaced by teams of professionals.

Its architecture is remarkable, having never been altered. Notably, the castle supports spurs of almond wood.

See also
List of castles in France

References

External links
 Article and photos on the Château du Coudray-Salbart 
 Site of the Association des amis du château de Coudray-Salbart 

Ruined castles in Nouvelle-Aquitaine
Monuments historiques of Nouvelle-Aquitaine
Deux-Sèvres